Inner Circle is a global dating app. Inner Circle is owned by Circle Imperium B.V., with head offices based in Amsterdam, the Netherlands. The app claims to bring together like-minded, career driven singles by matching single users on shared interests and hosting singles parties across the world.

History
Inner Circle was founded in 2012 by David Vermeulen, Serge Samusya  and Michael Krayenhoff. The dating app was originally launched in Amsterdam and is also available in London, Milan, Paris, Stockholm and Berlin. The dating app is also popular in Latin America, including Brazil, Argentina and Colombia. Inner Circle and Tinder changed the perception of online dating under young professionals in the Netherlands according to national newspaper de Volkskrant.

In June 2020 the dating app had more than 2.5 million members. The revenue model is a combination of subscriptions, events, and partnerships. Inner Circle has no outside funding, and has been profitable since its inception.

Overview
The network/app operates in a similar way to many dating sites: there are "like" functions, photo browsing, profile building, as well as ways to interact and chat. The app focuses on accountability to encourage respect and uses social network analysis for making connections. The website also has features similar to Facebook. Users post plans to go out to bars and clubs; users traveling to London can ask for advice and meet-ups. Members of Inner Circle get to invite five friends each, who are screened before approval. Users can access the platform through a website, or an iOS or Android app.

Inner Circle hosts offline events on a regular basis for users located in Amsterdam, London, Paris, Milan, Barcelona and Stockholm.

Awards and nominations

 Newcomer Website of the Year at the UK dating awards (2014, won)
 Best London Dating Event at the UK dating awards (2014, won)
 Best Dating Events Brand of 2015 at the UK dating awards (2015, won)
 Best Niche Dating Site 2016 at the Euro Dating Awards (2016, won)
 Online Dating Brand of the Year 2016 at the UK dating awards (2016, won)
 Most Disruptive Innovator 2017 at Deloitte Technology Fast 50 (2017, won)
 Winner of the Deloitte Technology Fast 50, with 3460% revenue growth (2018, won)
 Ranked in the FT1000 as one of the fastest-growing companies in Europe by the Financial Times (2020, #152)

References

External links
 

Online dating services of the Netherlands